Okkadu ( The One and Only Person) is a 2003 Indian Telugu-language romantic action film written and directed by Gunasekhar. It stars Mahesh Babu, Bhumika Chawla and Prakash Raj. The film was produced by M.S. Raju while music was composed by Mani Sharma and editing was by A. Sreekar Prasad. The film follows journey of a Kabaddi player, Ajay who rescues Swapna from Obul Reddy, when the latter tries to forcefully marry her.  

Released on 15 January 2003, Okkadu received positive reviews from critics and was a cult classic. The film was successful at the box office and became one of the highest-grossing Telugu films ever. It earned a distributor's share of 30–40crore. It has garnered eight Nandi Awards and four Filmfare Awards South, including Best Film – Telugu, and led Mahesh Babu to instant stardom and major breakthrough in his career. 

The film was later remade into Tamil as Ghilli (2004), Kannada as Ajay (2006), Bengali as Jor (2008), Hindi as Tevar (2015), Odia as Mate Aanidela Lakhe Phaguna (2008), and in Sinhala as Kabaddi (2021).

Plot 
Ajay Varma, a Hyderabad-based Kabbadi player and the son of DCP Vijay Varma, visits Kurnool to take part in a state-level tournament. In Kurnool, Ajay saves Swapna Reddy from Obul Reddy, a dangerous faction leader, who is in love with Swapna and wants to marry her against her wishes. Ajay learns that Swapna is trying to leave for the US to live with her uncle and pursue her studies after Obul killed her brothers over their disapproval of his interest in their sister on account of the age gap. 

In the process of saving Swapna, Ajay humiliates Obul by pushing him into a mud pond. Obul refuses to cleanse the mud until Swapna is found and brought back. Ajay helps Swapna escape and takes her to his house in the Old City, hiding her in his room with the help of his sister Asha. However, Ajay's parents find out she is hiding in their house. Swapna and Ajay run away again and eventually she falls in love with him. The next day, the police, led by Ajay's father Vijay, surround the Charminar where Swapna is hidden by Ajay. The duo, along with Ajay's friends, reaches the airport to go to the US. They bring her parents to see her one last time before she leaves. 

After Swapna passed airport security, Ajay realises he loves Swapna, where she shows up and hugs Ajay while proposing to him. At the airport, Vijay arrests Ajay while Obul's men whisk Swapna away. Later, Swapna taunts Obul by saying that Ajay will definitely come for her, Obul goes to the prison and asks Ajay to come with him. Vijay expresses that he is not worried about Ajay; rather, he is worried for Obul. Obul and his henchmen are kidnapped by Ajay, who, along with his friends, attend the finals of the national-level Kabaddi tournament. 

Obul's brother Siva Reddy, who happens to be the Home minister of the state, is waiting at the venue of Obul's marriage with Swapna. After learning about his whereabouts, Siva reaches the stadium along with Swapna and his mother where Ajay and Obul are fighting with each other. Swapna's father stabs Obul while his mother dies in a bomb blast. Siva Reddy decides not to react as it would harm his position as a minister and Ajay, whose team won the match, celebrates the victory with Swapna and his family. Later, Ajay and Swapna get married and live happily.

Cast 

 Mahesh Babu as Ajay Varma
 Bhumika Chawla as Swapna, Ajay's love interest
 Prakash Raj as Obul Reddy, Swapna's obsessive lover
 Mukesh Rishi as DCP Vijay Varma, Ajay's father
 Chandra Mohan as Dhasaratharami Reddy, Swapna's father
 Rajan P. Dev as Siva Reddy, Home Minister and Obul Reddy's brother
 Geetha as Vasundhara, Ajay's mother
 Telangana Shakuntala as Obul Reddy's mother
 Paruchuri Venkateswara Rao as Doondi 
 Niharika as Asha, Ajay's sister
 Ajay as Kumar, Ajay's friend
 Dharmavarapu Subramanyam as Subramanyam, a passport officer
 Achyuth as Siva, Swapna's brother 
 M. S. Narayana as a priest
 Gundu Hanumantha Rao as assistant priest

Production

Development 

During his days as an assistant director in Madras (now Chennai), Gunasekhar dreamt of directing a film with the backdrop of Charminar, a monument and mosque located in Hyderabad. After watching West Side Story (1961), he took inspiration from the war between two gangs and wrote a script choosing Charminar and Old city area of Hyderabad as the film's backdrop. Years later, Ashwini Dutt met Gunasekhar during the re-recording sessions of Choodalani Vundi (1998) where the latter saw the portfolio images of Mahesh Babu whose debut film Rajakumarudu was officially launched that day. Finding Mahesh Babu apt for the protagonist he envisioned, Gunasekhar narrated the script to him and gained his consent.

After the release of Mrugaraju (2001), Gunasekhar resumed work on the film's script. After reading an interview of Pullela Gopichand who pursued a career in badminton against his father's wishes and faced many hardships, Gunasekhar made the protagonist a person who aspires to be a kabaddi player against his father's wishes. He met Ramoji Rao who expressed his wish to produce the film and permitted Gunasekhar to erect a Charminar set at Ramoji Film City.

Ramoji Rao walked out due to unknown reasons and Mahesh Babu, along with Gunasekhar, met M. S. Raju at Padmalaya Studios office. Mahesh Babu asked Raju to permit them to erect a Charminar set as they cannot avail police permission to shoot at the original after a person committed suicide by jumping from the top. Raju agreed to do so after listening to the script narration and the project was subsequently announced.

Gunasekhar wanted to name the film as Athade Ame Sainyam, but the title was already registered for another film which made Gunasekhar name the film as Okkadu after considering Kabaddi. The film was produced under the banner Sumanth Art Productions with a budget of 89 crore.

Cast and crew 
Impressed with her screen presence in Yuvakudu (2000), Gunasekhar chose Bhumika Chawla as the film's female lead to be paired with Mahesh Babu. Mukesh Rishi and Geetha were signed to play Mahesh Babu's parents in the film. The former called it a character close to his heart, calling it is a "soft role after a string of ferocious roles that I have played". Prakash Raj was signed as the antagonist and was seen as a factionist who falls for Bhumika's character in the film. Telangana Shakuntala played the role of Prakash Raj's mother in the film for which she had to smoke cigar. Chandra Mohan and Niharika were seen in supporting roles as Bhumika's father and Mahesh Babu's sister respectively.

Paruchuri Brothers were signed to write the film's dialogues. Mani Sharma composed the score and Sekhar V. Joseph was its cinematographer. A. Sreekar Prasad edited the film, and Ashok Kumar was its art director. Sreekar Prasad called it a difficult film as it went through many forms of narration and he found it challenging to keep the pace very fast to make it slick and engaging. After the first copy was ready, Paruchuri Brothers suggested Gunasekhar to prefer a linear narrative to the non linear narrative being used. The latter, along with Sreekar Prasad, changed the non-linear narration to linear, within ten minutes.

Filming 
The film's unit erected the Charminar set in the ten acres of land owned by D. Ramanaidu at Gopannapalle near Hyderabad. The film's unit decided to construct the set with a length of  feet by not altering the minarets and instead reduce the total length of the remaining part. The surroundings of Charminar were recreated in five acres around the set. 300 workers were employed in the construction of the set which lasted for three months and costed 1.75 crore.

The makers decided to create the roads near the set using computer graphics in order to reduce the budget. Principal photography began in the same set and fifteen generators were used for illuminating the area. Strada Cranes were used for filming key scenes after ordinary cranes proved to be futile. The film's climax was shot in December 2002 for 11 days and 1000 junior artistes participated in the film's shoot amid extreme climatic conditions. Despite receiving training in Kabaddi, Mahesh Babu was injured several times during the film's shoot.

Soundtrack 

The music for the film was composed by Mani Sharma and the lyrics were written by Sirivennela Seetharama Sastry.

Release 
The film was released on 15 January 2003 in 165 screens. The audio was released on 19 December 2002. The film earned a distributor's share of  crore.

Reception 
A critic from The Hindu called the film "An opportunity for director Gunasekhar to make a mass movie with an artistic touch. And for Mahesh Babu to assert his versatility".

Remakes 
Okkadu was first remade in Tamil as Ghilli (2004) where Prakash Raj reprised his role. Later it got remade in Kannada as Ajay (2006), in Bengali as Jor (2008) and in Hindi as Tevar (2015) and in Odia as Mote Anidela Lakhe Phaguna (2008).  It was also remade in Sinhala language of Sri Lanka as Kabaddi (2021).

Awards

References

Sources

External links 
 

2003 films
Films directed by Gunasekhar
2000s Telugu-language films
Indian action films
2000s masala films
Telugu films remade in other languages
2003 action films
Films scored by Mani Sharma
Films set in Hyderabad, India
Films shot in Hyderabad, India
Indian sports films
Films shot at Ramoji Film City
Films set in Kurnool
Films set in Andhra Pradesh
Kabaddi in India